Jennifer Mary Weller is a New Zealand anaesthesiology academic. She is currently a full professor at the University of Auckland.

Academic career

Weller graduated from University of Adelaide, with her post-graduation training in hospitals in Canberra, Nottingham and Adelaide. She moved to Wellington Hospital in 1994 as a full-time specialist anaesthetist, eventually taking a Masters of Clinical Education from the University of New South Wales and taking on teaching at Victoria University of Wellington as well as medical duties. A move to Auckland and the University of Auckland led to a PhD in 2005. She rose to full professor in 2017.

Much of Weller's research involved MORSim, an operating theatre simulator used for training surgical teams.

Selected works 
 Weller, Jennifer M. "Simulation in undergraduate medical education: bridging the gap between theory and practice." Medical education 38, no. 1 (2004): 32–38.
 Webster, C. S., A. F. Merry, L. Larsson, K. A. McGrath, and Jennifer Weller. "The frequency and nature of drug administration error during anaesthesia." Anaesthesia and intensive care 29, no. 5 (2001): 494.
 Jensen, L. S., A. F. Merry, C. S. Webster, Jennifer Weller, and L. Larsson. "Evidence‐based strategies for preventing drug administration errors during anaesthesia." Anaesthesia 59, no. 5 (2004): 493–504.
 Weller, Jennifer, Matt Boyd, and David Cumin. "Teams, tribes and patient safety: overcoming barriers to effective teamwork in healthcare." Postgraduate medical journal (2014): postgradmedj-2012.
 Weller, J. M., M. Bloch, S. Young, M. Maze, S. Oyesola, J. Wyner, D. Dob et al. "Evaluation of high fidelity patient simulator in assessment of performance of anaesthetists." British Journal of Anaesthesia 90, no. 1 (2003): 43–47.

References

External links
  
 

Living people
Year of birth missing (living people)
New Zealand women academics
New Zealand medical researchers
New Zealand anaesthetists
University of Auckland alumni
University of New South Wales alumni
Academic staff of the University of Auckland
Academic staff of the University of Otago
University of Adelaide alumni
Australian emigrants to New Zealand
Women anesthesiologists
21st-century women physicians
Physician-scientists
New Zealand women medical doctors